is a river in Hokkaidō, Japan.

Etymology
In 1820, the explorer Takeshiro Matsuura (松浦 武四郎) proposed "Tokachi" as the name of the surrounding Tokachi Province, with each character corresponding to a Japanese homophone. The province was named after this river, which in turn was derived from the Ainu language word "tokapci".

Although the exact origins of "tokapci" were unknown, Hidezo Yamada, an Ainu language researcher, proposed these origins:

 tokap-usi ("breast, somewhere")
 toka-o-pci ("swamp, around a place, either")

Rivers of Hokkaido
Rivers of Japan